Edward Lyle (June 19, 1871 – January 19, 1938) was an American attorney and politician who served as a member of the Virginia Senate. After his service in the Senate, he was, for approximately 30 years an officer of Southern Bell in Atlanta.

References

External links
 
 

1871 births
1938 deaths
Democratic Party Virginia state senators
19th-century American politicians
20th-century American politicians